Composers Recordings, Inc. (CRI) was an American record label dedicated to the recording of contemporary classical music by American composers.  It was founded in 1954 by Otto Luening, Douglas Moore, and Oliver Daniel, and based in New York City.

The label released over 600 recordings on LP, cassette, and CD.  It went out of business in 2003 due to financial pressures, and the rights to CRI's recordings were transferred to New World Records in 2006.

Selected composers

Samuel Adler
Dominick Argento
Aaron Avshalomov
Jacob Avshalomov
Milton Babbitt
Samuel Barber
Jennifer Margaret Barker
Leslie Bassett
Irwin Bazelon
William Bergsma
Irving Berlin
Chester Biscardi
Marc Blitzstein
Henry Brant
Anthony Braxton
Martin Bresnick
Margaret Brouwer
Earle Brown
John Cage
Ronald Caltabiano
Elliott Carter
Chou Wen-chung
Chen Yi
John Corigliano
George Crumb
Henry Cowell
Alvin Curran
David Diamond
Jacob Druckman
Judy Dunaway
Donald Erb
Morton Feldman
Scott Fields
Irving Fine
Vivian Fine
Ross Lee Finney
Gene Gutchë
Daron Hagen
Roy Harris
Lou Harrison
Robert Helps
Lee Hoiby
Karel Husa
Andrew Imbrie
Charles Ives
Philip James
Leroy Jenkins
Tom Johnson
Ben Johnston
Samuel Jones
Victoria Jordanova
Aaron Jay Kernis
Guy Klucevsek
Barbara Kolb
Ernst Krenek
Meyer Kupferman
Ezra Laderman
David Lang
Benjamin Lees
John Anthony Lennon
Fred Lerdahl
Otto Luening
Donald Martino
William Mayer
Barton McLean
Priscilla McLean
Jacques de Menasce
Peter Mennin
Jeffrey Mumford
Alwin Nikolais
Pauline Oliveros
Hall Overton
Harry Partch
P. Q. Phan
Tobias Picker
Cole Porter
Shulamit Ran
Bernard Rands
Gardner Read
Wallingford Riegger
Vittorio Rieti
Neil Rolnick
Ned Rorem
Dane Rudhyar
Frederic Rzewski
Roger Sessions
Judith Shatin
Alice Shields
Hale Smith
Harvey Sollberger
Tan Dun
Virgil Thomson
Francis Thorne
Joan Tower
Lester Trimble
Richard Aaker Trythall
Chinary Ung
Vladimir Ussachevsky
Robert Ward
Richard Wernick
Robert Willoughby
Stefan Wolpe
Charles Wuorinen
Zhou Long
Evan Ziporyn

See also
 List of record labels

References

External links
Composers Recordings Inc. Records, 1946-2007 Music Division, New York Public Library for the Performing Arts.

Record labels established in 1954
Record labels disestablished in 2003
Contemporary classical music
20th-century classical music
Classical music record labels
Defunct record labels of the United States
1954 establishments in New York (state)
2003 disestablishments in New York (state)
Defunct companies based in New York City